Bridgelands is a village and an 18th-century house in the Scottish Borders area of Scotland, in the parish of Selkirk. Sir Henry Raeburn's wife came from Bridgelands.

See also
List of places in the Scottish Borders
List of places in Scotland

External links

Bridgelands House
Old Roads of Scotland
"Watch out for the Bridgelands Beast"

Villages in the Scottish Borders